Larry Leishman (April 4, 1947 in Dunfermline, Scotland – March 4, 2013) was a Canadian guitarist who was a member of Toronto R&B outfit, Jon and Lee & The Checkmates during the mid 1960s. When the band broke up in September 1967, he briefly worked with David Clayton-Thomas and various Toronto bands, including Bobby Kris & The Imperials and The Duke Edwards Cycle before joining Rhinoceros in August 1969.

References

1947 births
Canadian rock guitarists
Canadian male guitarists
Canadian rhythm and blues musicians
People from Dunfermline
2013 deaths
20th-century Canadian guitarists
20th-century Canadian male musicians
Jon and Lee & the Checkmates members
Rhinoceros (band) members